Muhammad Ali Boulevard is a street located in downtown Louisville, Kentucky. The street was renamed in 1978 after Muhammad Ali, a Louisville native with a highly successful Olympic and professional boxing career. Ali was three time world heavyweight champion.

The street is also formerly and less commonly known as Walnut Street east of 28th Street, including the entire downtown section, and Michigan Drive west of 28th Street. These names correspond to the old names of the street prior to its renaming in 1978.

The street carries one-way westbound traffic only across its entire length. Muhammad Ali Boulevard is a couplet with parallel and eastbound Chestnut Street and River Park Drive. However, through downtown, Liberty Street is a closer opposite-direction one-way street, and parts of Madison and Vermont Streets provide intermediate two-way parallel traffic flow over some parts of the route.

Major intersections

References

See also
List of roads in Louisville, Kentucky

Streets in Kentucky
Transportation in Louisville, Kentucky
Transportation in Jefferson County, Kentucky